Nuria Moreno de Pedrón (born 7 June 1975 in Madrid) is a retired female field hockey player from Spain. She was a member of the women's national team at the 2000 Summer Olympics. There the team ended up in fourth place. She played club hockey for SPV 51 in Madrid, and is married to long-distance runner José Manuel Martínez.

References
sports-reference

External links
 

1975 births
Living people
Spanish female field hockey players
Olympic field hockey players of Spain
Field hockey players at the 2000 Summer Olympics
Field hockey players from Madrid